DCS Group (UK) Ltd  (formerly DCS Europe plc) is a seller and distributor of health, beauty and household brands working through a number of subsidiary companies and based in Banbury, Oxfordshire, England. The DCS in the name is Denys C. Shortt OBE, who founded the company in 1994. The business had an annual turnover of over £149 million in 2012.

History

The business reportedly had sales of £185.6 million in 2015.

DCS Group UK Ltd has its own brands of beauty products, Enliven and Natural Elements. The brands are exported to 70 countries worldwide.

In 2012, export sales fell from £16 million to £13.5 million.

In 2016 DCS was named as a Sunday Times TopTrack 250 Company for the second year running.

DCS companies

 DCS Group Holdings
 DCS Inc
 DCS Central
 DCS Export
 DCS Manufacturing
 DCS Repacking
 DCS High Street Discount
 Poundzone
 Enliven
 DCS Category Management

References

6. Forbes article : 

Companies based in Stratford-upon-Avon